The adjalin is a type of zither native to Benin.

It consists of a rectangular form constructed of bamboo branches, tied together with raffia.

It is used in the traditional music of Benin, particularly in public festivals and rituals.

Zithers
Beninese musical instruments